Sikhdta or Silga is a settlement in the Java district of South Ossetia, a region of Georgia whose sovereignty is disputed.

See also
 Dzau district

References 

Populated places in Dzau District